Alexander Svirsky or Alexander of Svir (1448–1533) was an Eastern Orthodox saint, monk, and hegumen of the Russian Orthodox Church.

Amos (his baptismal name) was born to a peasant family in the Novgorod Republic, east of Ladoga. At the age of 19, he left home for the Valaam Monastery and became a monk and later a hermit. In 1506, Serapion, Archbishop of Novgorod, appointed him Hegumen of the Trinity monastery, which later became known as Alexander-Svirsky Monastery.

Saint Alexander became known for his righteous life and contemplative miracles, including the appearances of the Trinity and the Virgin Mary with the Holy Child. Russian Orthodox Church canonized Alexander Svirsky in the year of 1547. His feast day is commemorated on April 17 and August 30, according to the Eastern Orthodox liturgical calendar.

Relics of Saint Alexander were found on April 17 (27), 1641. According to the Vita of the saint, they were found incorruptible.

On October 22, 1918, the coffin with the relics of Alexander Svirsky was opened. According to Soviet reports, instead of relics, a wax doll was supposedly found. However, testimony of the monks present, as well as a later Soviet commission under the direction of Grigory Zinoviev, demonstrated that a human body instead of a wax figure was present in the coffin.

References

1448 births
1533 deaths
Russian saints of the Eastern Orthodox Church
Incorrupt saints
Russian monks
16th-century Christian saints
People from medieval Novgorod